Vernon White may refer to:

 Vernon White (fighter), mixed martial artist
 Vernon White (politician)
 Vernon White (theologian), British theologian